SS Penguin was a New Zealand inter-island ferry steamer that sank off Cape Terawhiti after striking a rock near the entrance to Wellington Harbour in poor weather on 12 February 1909. Penguins sinking caused the deaths of 75 people, leaving only 30 survivors. This was New Zealand's worst maritime disaster of the 20th century.

Ship history
Penguin was built by Tod & McGregor of Glasgow, Scotland, for G. & J. Burns of Glasgow, and launched on 21 January 1864. Registered in Glasgow on 4 April 1864, she was finally sold to the Union Steamship Company in 1879, and was extensively refitted in 1882.

In 1904, a passenger aboard the SS Penguin tried to shoot a dolphin named Pelorus Jack with a rifle, leading to Jack becoming the first individual sea creature protected by law in any country.

Sinking
Penguin departed Picton on 12 February 1909 en route to Wellington in good conditions. However, the weather conditions changed by 8pm, with very strong winds and bad visibility. At 10pm, Captain Francis Naylor headed farther out to sea to wait for a break in the weather, but the ship smashed into Thoms Rock while making the turn, and water started to pour in. Women and children were loaded into the lifeboats, but the rough seas dragged the lifeboats underwater; only one woman survived, and all the children were killed. Other survivors drifted for hours on rafts before reaching safety. As the Penguin sank, seawater flooded the engine room. The cold water reached the boilers, and a massive steam explosion violently fractured the ship.

Following the disaster, a half-day holiday was declared in Wellington to allow the many funerals to be held, as some 40 people were laid to rest in Karori Cemetery.

A court of inquiry found that the ship struck Thoms Rock near the mouth to Karori Stream in Cook Strait. The captain maintained that it had struck the submerged hull of the Rio Loge, lost the month before. On the 100th anniversary of the sinking, Wellington's mayor unveiled a plaque at Tongue Point, near the site of the wreck.

References

Further reading

External links

1864 ships
1909 in New Zealand
Ships built on the River Clyde
Cook Strait ferries
History of the Wellington Region
Maritime incidents in 1909
Ships of the Union Steam Ship Company
Shipwrecks of the Cook Strait
Wellington Harbour
1900s in Wellington